Southern Locomotives Ltd is an organisation that restores, maintains and runs steam locomotives. It is based at Herston, Swanage, Dorset. The Patron of the organisation is the actor Edward Fox.

Locomotives

Locomotives sold by Southern Locomotives Ltd 

 31178 SECR P class; sold to the Bluebell Railway
 35022 Holland-America Line, SR Merchant Navy class; sold to Jeremy Hosking as spares for 35027
 35027 Port Line, SR Merchant Navy class; sold to Jeremy Hosking for overhaul to mainline condition
 80078 BR Standard Class 4 2-6-4 Tank; sold to a private buyer in October 2012

References

Notes

External links

 Southern Locomotives Ltd

Folkestone and Hythe District
Organisations based in Dorset
Heritage railways in the United Kingdom